The 2008 AFL Under 18 Championships is the 2008 series of the AFL Under 18 Championships, a state and territory based Australian rules football competition which showcase the best junior footballers in Australia, primarily with the aim for them to be drafted into the Australian Football League.

The competition is split into two divisions.  The major football states of Victoria (split into separate Country and Metropolitan teams), South Australia and Western Australia are in Division 1, with the smaller football states of Northern Territory, NSW/ACT, Tasmania and Queensland are in Division 2.  Unlike previous years, in 2008 the top two teams from the Division 2 competition advanced to be part of Division 1.

Division 2 games were played as a qualifying series over a week in May in Melbourne, whereas Division 1 will be played mainly as curtain-raisers before AFL matches in late May and early June.

Division 2 qualifying series

Division 2 Table

Tasmania is the No.1 Qualifier and NSW/ACT is the No.2 Qualifier into Division 1.

Mitch Robinson from Tasmania won the Hunter-Harrison Medal as best player in Division 2.

Division 1

In 2008 Division One was extended from 3 rounds to 5 rounds with the addition of the top 2 teams from Division Two.

Fox Sports 1 telecast the final round of games live from the Telstra Dome on Wednesday 9 July from 10am EST.

Melbourne Radio Station 3XX 1611AM broadcast games played in Melbourne on Wednesday 9 July

Division 1 Table

The Larke Medal (Best Player in Div 1) was awarded to Jack Watts (Victoria Metro).

2008 AFL Under 18 All-Australian team
The 2008 Under 18 All-Australian team was announced following the conclusion of the 2008 AFL National Under 18 Championships.

References

External links
AFL.com.au NAB Under 18 Championships News Page

Afl National Under 18 Championships, 2008
Australian rules football competitions
Australian rules football competition seasons
Australian rules interstate football